The Chongqing shooting was a mass shooting that occurred in Chongqing, China on 5 April 1993. Chen Xuerong, a worker at the Chongqing machine factory, who was angered by a mistake on his timesheet, armed himself with a hunting rifle and searched for his boss with the intent to kill him, but upon finding that the latter was not present he shot dead three of his co-workers.

Pursued by security guards, Chen escaped the factory grounds by jumping over a wall, and once out on the street fired at a family of four passing by on a motorcycle with sidecar, fatally hitting a man and two women, and wounding the fourth. He next injured a soldier in a van, and then killed another man, on whose bike he fled. At a junction Chen stopped and hijacked a taxi, after killing the driver, and injuring his passenger, and eventually killed himself by driving down a 30-meters deep ravine, about 40 minutes after firing his first shots.

References

Mass murder in 1993
Murder–suicides in China
Massacres in China
Mass shootings in China
Deaths by firearm in China
History of Chongqing
1993 murders in China
20th-century mass murder in China